Kushiro National College of Technology（日本語:釧路工業高等専門学校（くしろこうぎょうこうとうせんもんがっこう）is a national college of technology in Kushiro, Hokkaido, Japan. It was founded in 1965.

Departments

Department（Associate Course）

Students admitted after 2016 
Department of Creative Engineering 
Smart Mechanics Course
Field of Information Engineering, Field of Mechanical Engineering
Electronics Course
Field of Electrical Engineering, Field of Electronic Engineering
Architecture Course
Field of Architecture

Students admitted before 2015 
Department of Mechanical Engineering
Department of Electrical Engineering
Department of Electronic Engineering
Department of Information Engineering
Department of Architecture

Advanced Course 
Advanced Course of Construction and Manufacturing Systems Engineering
Advanced Course of Electronic and Information Systems Engineering

Library 
The total area of the library is 1,550 m2. The number of books held is 96,764 (as of 27 February 2012). Following renovation work in 2013, it was made barrier-free. In addition to books, magazines, DVD, CD-ROM, etc. are provided. PCs are available that can search information. The library can be used not only by students and faculty members, but also by outsiders. Anyone can make a request to receive books.

Information Processing Center

Cooperative Technology Center 
Established in 2000 with the aim of supporting local industries through joint research.

Dormitory 
The dormitory on the school grounds was named Tsurusho Dormitory. As of 2019, the capacity of the dormitory is 431 (336 males and 95 females).

Only graduate students who live outside Kushiro are allowed to stay in the dormitory, for up to 5 years.

References

External links 
 釧路工業高等専門学校

Universities and colleges in Hokkaido